Capital Match is a invoice financing platform for small and medium enterprises (SMEs) in Southeast Asia. Headquartered in Singapore, it operates an online platform for SMEs to seek funds from investors.

History 
Capital Match was incorporated in 2014 and launched operationally in early 2015.

In early 2017, Capital Match’s subsidiary, CM Advisers Pte. Ltd., obtained a CMS Licence with the Monetary Authority of Singapore (MAS).

As of June 2017, Capital Match claims to have processed financing of more than S$40 million in cumulative origination. Capital Match has received funding from investors that include Dymon Asia Ventures, Innosight Ventures and Crystal Horse Investments, among others.

Business model 
Capital Match provides an online platform for SMEs to obtain invoice financing from individual and corporate investors

Investors can browse the facilities on the platform and make a minimum commitment of S$1,000 per facility and earn interest on their investments. Capital Match earns by charging borrowers a processing fee and late payment fee (in the case whereby repayments from the borrower are delayed) and investors a commission fee.

Controversy 
In February 2022, several reports appeared in the Singapore financial press about large losses for users of Capital Match due to weak invoice verification processes.

Also in February 2022, Monetary Authority of Singapore (MAS) has put Capital Match on the Investor Alert List published on its website.

References

External links 

Financial services companies established in 2014
2014 establishments in Singapore
Privately held companies of Singapore
Peer-to-peer lending companies
Crowdfunding platforms of Singapore